Barnaby's Tower stands at the southeast corner of the city walls of Chester, Cheshire, England.  It is recorded in the National Heritage List for England as a designated Grade I listed building.

The tower probably dates from the 13th century, and it was damaged in 1644–46 during the Civil War.  When the city walls were converted into a raised walkway between 1702 and 1708, the tower was converted to form a feature at this corner.  It has been repaired on occasions since, and in 1879–80 was altered at the expense of one of the city councillors.

The tower is constructed in coursed red sandstone rubble, and stands on a stony outcrop.  It forms a three-sided projection from the walls, its top being level with the walkway, and is decorated with mock crenellation. There is no evidence of any chamber at a lower level.

See also

Grade I listed buildings in Cheshire West and Chester

References

External links
 

Buildings and structures in Chester
Grade I listed buildings in Chester
Grade I listed towers
Towers in Cheshire